Alfred Clifton Hughes, KCHS (born December 2, 1932) is a retired American prelate of the Catholic Church. He served as the 13th archbishop of the Archdiocese of New Orleans in Louisiana from 2002 to 2009.  

Hughes previously served as bishop of the Diocese of Baton Rouge in Louisiana from 1993 to 2002 and as an auxiliary bishop of the Archdiocese of Boston in Massachusetts from 1981 to 1993

Biography

Early life 
Alfred Hughes was born on December 2, 1932, in West Roxbury, Massachusetts, as the third of the four children of Alfred and Ellen (née Hennessey) Hughes; he has two older sisters, Dorothy Callahan and Marie Morgan, and a younger brother, a Jesuit priest named Kenneth. Hughes studied at St. John's Seminary College, from where he received his bachelor's degree in philosophy in 1954, and then furthered his studies in Rome at the Pontifical Gregorian University until 1958.

Hughes was ordained to the priesthood by Archbishop Martin John O’Connor for the Archdiocese of Boston in Rome on December 15, 1957, and then did pastoral work before returning to the Gregorian to obtain a doctorate in spiritual theology from 1959 to 1961. Upon his return to the United States, he became a professor, as well as spiritual director and lecturer, at St. John's Seminary in 1962.

Auxiliary Bishop of Boston 
On July 21, 1981, Hughes was appointed auxiliary bishop of the Archdiocese of Boston and Titular Bishop of Maximiana in Byzacena by Pope John Paul II. He received his episcopal consecration on September 14, 1981, from Cardinal Humberto Medeiros, with Bishops Thomas Daily and John D'Arcy serving as co-consecrators. Hughes served as rector of St. John's Seminary from 1981 to 1986, and as vicar general and vicar of administration from 1990 until 1993.

Bishop of Baton Rouge 
Hughes was named bishop of the Diocese of Baton Rouge by John Paul II on September 7, 1993; he was installed on November 7, 1993.

Coadjutor Archbishop and Archbishop of New Orleans 
On February 16, 2001, Hughes was appointed by John Paul II as coadjutor archbishop of the Archdiocese of New Orleans, serving under Archbishop Francis Schulte. He visited 90 of the archdiocese’s 142 parishes when he arrived there to become more familiar with the people.

Hughes automaticall succeeded Schulte as archbishop of New Orleans upon the latter’s retirement on January 3, 2002. His tenure was marked by the devastating Hurricane Katrina in 2005, after which he made a televised appearance with Bishop Robert Muench (his successor in Baton Rouge), saying, “God has brought us to our knees in the face of disaster. We are so overwhelmed, we do not really know how to respond. Powerlessness leads us to prayer. And we know when we turn to God, God offers us his grace”. In response to questioning religion during the hurricane’s aftermath, Hughes also said,“People can either turn inward on themselves and lose hope, or they turn upward to God and outward to other people. Our faith teaches us to do the latter, to really believe that God is present and is asking us to be partners with him in the recovery and restoration”.Hughes implemented a controversial post-Katrina church consolidation program that reduced the diocese from 142 parishes to 108. The storm drove away nearly a quarter of its former membership and left it with nearly $300 million in physical damage.

Questions were raised concerning Hughes's handling of sexual abuse cases by the clergy, in both Boston and New Orleans. For this, he apologized and said, “Our action or inaction failed to protect the innocents among us, the children. I ask for forgiveness"

Hughes placed an emphasis on evangelization as a major theme of his tenure. He also sits on numerous committees of the United States Conference of Catholic Bishops, including that which oversees the use of the Catechism of the Catholic Church.

On April 2, 2009, Hughes "joined a growing chorus of Catholic bishops deploring the University of Notre Dame's decision to award President Barack Obama an honorary doctorate at graduation exercises" in May 2009. The reasons concerned Obama's support for abortion rights for women and other issues viewed as incompatible with the teaching of the Catholic Church, with which the Notre Dame is affiliated.

A front-page article in the Times-Picayune on April 17, 2009 pictured Hughes and described his support, representing the Louisiana Conference of Catholic Bishops, of State Senate Bill 115, authored by Danny Martiny. It was to ban mixing of "human and animal cells in a Petri dish" and was thought to be the first bill of its kind, a "pre-emptive strike" against attempts to create hybrid human-ape creatures. 

A week later, another front-page article in the Times-Picayune described Hughes' refusal to attend commencement exercises at Xavier University of Louisiana in New Orleans because the ceremony included awarding of an honorary degree to author Donna Brazile, a supporter of abortion rights.

On June 12, 2009, Hughes was succeeded by Gregory Aymond. Hughes continued to serve as apostolic administrator until 2009 August 20.

See also
 

 Catholic Church hierarchy
 Catholic Church in the United States
 Historical list of the Catholic bishops of the United States
 List of Catholic bishops of the United States
 Lists of patriarchs, archbishops, and bishops

References

External links

 Roman Catholic Archdiocese of New Orleans Official Site

Episcopal succession

1932 births
Living people
Roman Catholic archbishops of New Orleans
20th-century Roman Catholic bishops in the United States
Clergy from Boston
Roman Catholic Diocese of Baton Rouge
Members of the Order of the Holy Sepulchre
People from West Roxbury, Boston
21st-century Roman Catholic archbishops in the United States